The 2017 West Virginia Mountaineers baseball team represents West Virginia University during the 2017 NCAA Division I baseball season. The Mountaineers play their home games at Monongalia County Ballpark as a member of the Big 12 Conference. They are led by head coach Randy Mazey, in his 5th season at West Virginia.

Previous season

Schedule and results

Rankings

References

West Virginia Mountaineers
West Virginia Mountaineers baseball seasons
West Virgin